Follow the Rules is an American reality television series starring hip-hop artist Ja Rule. The series premiered on October 26, 2015, on MTV, and follows the life of Ja Rule and his family.

Episodes

References

2010s American reality television series
2015 American television series debuts
2015 American television series endings
Television series based on singers and musicians
Television series by 51 Minds Entertainment
English-language television shows
MTV original programming